David Hopkinson Nichols (March 16, 1826 – December 17, 1900) was the eighth Lieutenant Governor of Colorado, United States, serving from 1893 to 1895 under Davis Hanson Waite.

Nichols was born in Hardwick, Vermont in 1826. He served in the Mexican–American War and later moved to Colorado, living there beginning in 1859. He was elected sheriff of Boulder in 1863, but absented himself from office in order to take a captain's commission with the Third Colorado Volunteer Cavalry, called upon by Territorial Governor John Evans in 1864 to suppress Indian uprisings. In his capacity as Captain of Company D, Nichols participated in the infamous Sand Creek Massacre on November 29, 1864.

Following his return to Boulder, Nichols was elected to the territorial Legislature and gave up his position as Sheriff. He served two non-consecutive terms in the Legislature.   A member of Columbia Lodge #14 he and his masonic brothers were instrumental in bringing the University of Colorado to Boulder.

Nichols served as lieutenant governor of Colorado from 1893 to 1895 and was a member of the Board of Commissioners for the Colorado State Penitentiary for 19 years. Nichols died at his home near Boulder on the night of December 17, 1900.

See also
Lora Webb Nichols, his granddaughter

References

 Obituary Notes, The New York Times, December 18, 1900, Page 9.

American military personnel of the Mexican–American War
Lieutenant Governors of Colorado
Colorado sheriffs
People's Party (United States) elected officials
Colorado Populists
Politicians from Boulder, Colorado
People from Caledonia County, Vermont
1826 births
1900 deaths